Mata Tripta  (Punjabi: ਮਾਤਾ ਤ੍ਰਿਪਤਾ; mātā tripatā) was the mother of Guru Nanak Dev, the founder of Sikhism. Her father was Bhai Raam, a Jhangar Khatri from the village of Chaliawala (or Chahal), near Lahore, and her mother was Mata Bhirai. She is said to have possessed a kind-hearted and soft-spoken disposition. She gave birth to her first child, a daughter named Nanaki in 1464. Due to the birth of a girl child as the first-born and the resultant disappoint of her husband, Mata Tripta started becoming more fervently religious in-order to please the deities in hopes for a son. Mata Tripta gave birth to Guru Nanak Dev on 23 November 1469, in the village of Rai Bhoi Di Talwandi, some thirty five miles west of Lahore in the Sheikhupura district of Punjab, Pakistan. She was born from a Hindu family. The name of the town was changed to Nankana Sahib in honour of the Guru.

References

Indian Sikhs
Family members of the Sikh gurus
Punjabi women
Year of birth unknown
Year of death unknown
Place of death missing
Place of birth missing